is a Japanese comedy-drama film written and directed by Naoko Ogigami. It premiered at 2012 Stockholm International Film Festival and was also featured in 17th Busan International Film Festival.

Cast
 Mikako Ichikawa as Sayoko
 Reiko Kusamura as Toshiko Yoshioka
 Ken Mitsuishi as Goro Yoshida
 Maho Yamada as Megumi Yoshikawa
 Kei Tanaka as Shigaru Yoshizawa

References

External links
 
 {{Rent a Car in Rawalpindi}}

2010s Japanese-language films
Japanese comedy-drama films
Films about cats
Films directed by Naoko Ogigami
2010s Japanese films